"Wake Me Up Before You Go-Go" is a song by the English duo Wham!, first released as a single in the UK on 14 May 1984. It became their first UK and US number one hit. It was written and produced by George Michael. The single was certified platinum in the US, which at the time commemorated sales of over two million copies. The music video features Michael and Ridgeley wearing oversized message T-shirts ("CHOOSE LIFE") created by Katharine Hamnett, starting a craze covered in the 2002 VH1 series I Love the 80s.

The song was ranked number 28 on VH1's 100 Greatest Songs of the '80s.

History
Michael's inspiration for the song was a scribbled note that his bandmate Andrew Ridgeley had left for his parents, intended to read "wake me up before you go" but with "up" accidentally written twice, so Ridgeley wrote "go" twice on purpose.

In 1984, George Michael had this to say on the development of the song:

It was recorded within two days at Sarm West Studio 2 in London, with a live rhythm section. The song, according to Michael, had been done in one take without any drop-ins (overdubs) at all - production-wise, he noted that the two options to him were "either to be like Trevor Horn and go for stunning sounds on your own, or just get a great sound on each instrument and go for a live take".

The UK sleeve was designed by Peter Saville, with photography by Trevor Key.

Reception
Cash Box said that "the Motown groove and patent vocals of 'Wake Me Up Before You Go-Go' are perfect CHR material which is executed expertly by this British duo."

The song entered the UK Singles Chart at number four – after much hype from the duo claiming they would go straight in at number one, which was a rare occurrence then – and climbed to the top spot seven days later, staying there for two weeks. The song also went to the top of the Billboard Hot 100 in the United States, holding the top spot for three weeks.

Music video
The music video for the song was directed by Andy Morahan. It showcases the band performing for an audience of mostly teenagers at Brixton Academy in South London. The band was wearing Katharine Hamnett t-shirt designs that said "CHOOSE LIFE".

Popular culture
The song was notably used in the gas station sequence in Zoolander. It was also featured in the opening for the 2016 Primetime Emmy Awards (where Jimmy Kimmel is attempting to get to), the episode "The Unincludeds" in season 13 of American Dad! and premiere episode of Moon Knight.

Track listing

Note: The US 7-inch single (Columbia 04552) has identical track listing.
It was also released as a CD single in 1999

Chart performance

Weekly charts

Year-end charts

Certifications

See also
 List of Billboard Hot 100 number-one singles of 1984

References

External links
 
 Song review from AllMusic

1984 songs
1984 singles
1985 singles
Billboard Hot 100 number-one singles
Cashbox number-one singles
CBS Records singles
Columbia Records singles
Dutch Top 40 number-one singles
Epic Records singles
European Hot 100 Singles number-one singles
Music videos directed by Andy Morahan
Number-one singles in Australia
Number-one singles in Iceland
Number-one singles in Norway
Number-one singles in Sweden
RPM Top Singles number-one singles
Songs written by George Michael
Song recordings produced by George Michael
UK Singles Chart number-one singles
Wham! songs
Songs about dancing